Miss República Dominicana 2011 was held March 8, 2011 in Renaissance Auditorio de Festival del Hotel Jaragua, Santo Domingo. The Miss República Dominicana 2011 winner will represent the Dominican Republic in Miss Universe 2011, the First Runner Up or Miss Continente Dominicana will enter Miss Continente Americano 2011 and the Second Runner Up or Miss Hispanoamericana RD will enter Reina Hispanoamericana 2011. The Third Runner Up will enter Miss Supranational 2011. The Fourth Runner Up will enter Miss Intercontinental 2011.  The winner, Dalia Fernández of Santiago, was crowned by Eva Arias, Miss Dominican Republic 2010.

Results

Contestants

References

External links
Official website

Miss Dominican Republic
Dominican Republic